The following is a list of music releases on The Echo Label. From late 2008, the label ceased trading as a record company and became only a legal entity to maintain copyrights on existing releases, which means the following list can be seen as complete.

The most successful artists on their roster were Feeder, Moloko and Babybird, Moloko became the only artist of theirs to achieve a number one album anywhere in the world, when Statues reached that position in Flanders. They are also the only artist to get an IFPI sales award when the album passed 500,000 units in Europe, certifying it gold and the first artist of theirs to get a UK platinum certification by the BPI when their previous album Things to Make and Do reached the required 300,000 unit shipments in 2000, and took six months  from the release date to do so. Feeder on the other hand became the only artist on the Echo roster to gain two platinum awards in the UK when Comfort in Sound and Echo Park both picked up the sales certificates in 2003, they later went on in 2006 to pick up their third when The Singles became the first Echo album to go platinum in less than three months- the first quarter of the album's debut year from its release date. Although Moloko had the highest-placed single in the UK charts when "The Time is Now" made number two in 2000 (kept off the top spot by Melanie C and Lisa Left-Eye Lopes with "Never Be the Same Again"), Feeder arguably have the most well-known single release on Echo's roster. "Buck Rogers" reached number five in January 2001, making it their first ever top 10 single and has over the years become an XFM and UK summer music festival anthem. Feeder have now formed their own label Big Teeth Music for domestic releases, and are still signed to their Japanese label Victor. Moloko on the other hand split in 2006. Their first artist on the label to achieve gold sales was that of Babybird for their album Ugly Beautiful in 1996, while its signature single "You're Gorgeous" became the only ever single on the label to gain gold sales, when it passed the required 400,000 in the UK. The only other certified singles are Moloko's "Sing it Back" and "The Time Is Now", both of which have been certified Silver, marking sales of 200,000.

In the fall of 2017, The Echo Label acquired the catalogues of Ash, Deichkind, DevilDriver, Thomas Dolby, Megadeth, Sigue Sigue Sputnik, The Subways, Supergrass, and White Town from Warner Music Group.

The Echo numbering system
Nearly all Echo releases start with the prefix EC with a following H for albums and an S for singles, though due to the number of formats for each release, each different media has additional characters in the catalogue number.

This is the format used for each different type of media:

CD Album - ECHCD (for a limited or double-disc version of a CD album ECHCX is used)
CD + DVD Album - ECHDV
Vinyl LP - ECHLP
Cassette Album - ECHMC
SACD Album - ECHSACD
7" Single - ECS (where there is a second 7" format ECSX is used)
10" Single - ECST
12" Single - ECSY (where there is a second 12" format ECSYX is used)
CD single - ECSCD
Maxi CD - ECSCX (commonly used when a second CD format is present)
Cassette Single - ECSMC

Catalogue

Albums

I  UK Compilations Chart
II  UK Budget Albums Chart

Singles & EPs
{| class="wikitable sortable"
|-
! No.
! Year
! Artist
! Title
!width="40"|
|-
| ECS 1 ||  || Zu || Apart EP The Apart EP  ||
|-
| ECS 3 ||  || Nyack || Savage Smile EP  ||
|-
| ECS 4 ||  ||  Cope, JulianJulian Cope || Paranormal in the West Country EP  ||
|-
| ECS 6 ||  || .O.rang || Spoor EP  ||
|-
| ECS 7 ||  || Nyack || I'm Your Star  ||
|-
| ECS 8 ||  || Moloko || Moloko EP  ||
|-
| ECS 10 ||  || Garside, Melanie Melanie Garside || Big White Room  ||
|-
| ECS 11 ||  || Cope, Julian Julian Cope || Try Try Try EP  ||
|-
| ECS 12 ||  || Moloko || Fun For Me  ||
|-
| ECS 13 ||  || Feeder || Two Colours  ||
|-
| ECS 15 ||  || Dudley, Anne Anne Dudley || Veni Emmanuel  ||
|-
| ECS 16 ||  || Moloko || Dominoid  ||
|-
| ECS 17 ||  || Denim || It Fell Off the Back of a Lorry  ||
|-
| ECS 18 ||  || Garside, Melanie Melanie Garside || She Knows  ||
|-
| ECS 20 ||  || Moloko || Fun For Me (Re-issue) ||
|-
| ECS 21 ||  || Garside, Melanie Melanie Garside || Has and to Do (withdrawn) ||
|-
| ECS 22 ||  || Cope, Julian Julian Cope || I Come From Another Planet, Baby  ||
|-
| ECS 23 ||  || Mono || Life in Mono  ||
|-
| ECS 24 ||  || Babybird || Goodnight  ||
|-
| ECS 25 ||  || Cope, Julian Julian Cope || Planetary Sit-In (Every Girl Has Your Name)  ||
|-
| ECS 26 ||  || Babybird || You're Gorgeous  ||
|-
| ECS 27 ||  || Feeder || Stereo World  ||
|-
| ECS 29 ||  || .O.rang || P53 (Remix)  ||
|-
| ECS 30 ||  || Subcircus || 86'd  ||
|-
| ECS 31 ||  || Babybird || Candy Girl  ||
|-
| ECS 32 ||  || Feeder || Tangerine  ||
|-
| ECS 33 ||  || Babybird || Cornershop  ||
|-
| ECS 34 ||  || Subcircus || You Love You  ||
|-
| ECS 35 ||  || Mono || Silicone  ||
|-
| ECS 36 ||  || Feeder || Cement  ||
|-
| ECS 37 ||  || D'Influence || Shake It  ||
|-
| ECS 40 ||  || Mono || Slimcea Girl  ||
|-
| ECS 41 ||  || D'Influence || Hypnotize  ||
|-
| ECS 42 ||  || Feeder || Crash  ||
|-
| ECS 43 ||  || Subcircus || 86'd (Re-issue) ||
|-
| ECS 44 ||  || Feeder || High  ||
|-
| ECS 45 ||  || D'Influence || Magic  ||
|-
| ECS 46 ||  || Townshend, Fuzz Fuzz Townshend || ''Hello Darlin  ||
|-
| ECS 47 ||  || Townshend, Fuzz Fuzz Townshend || Smash It  ||
|-
| ECS 48 ||  || Mono || High Life  ||
|-
| ECS 49 ||  || Funky People || Funky Music  ||
|-
| ECS 50 ||  || D'Influence || Falling  ||
|-
| ECS 51 ||  || Lhooq  || Losing Hand  ||
|-
| ECS 52 ||  || Feeder  || Suffocate  ||
|-
| ECS 53 ||  || Townshend, Fuzz Fuzz Townshend  || Tasty Big Ed  ||
|-
| ECS 54 ||  || Moloko  || Flipside, The The Flipside  ||
|-
| ECS 56 ||  || D'Influence  || Rock With You  ||
|-
| ECS 57 ||  || Lhooq  || I Don't Want to Know  ||
|-
| ECS 58 ||  || Almond, Marc Marc Almond  || Black Kiss  ||
|-
| ECS 60 ||  || Babybird  || Bad Old Man  ||
|-
| ECS 61 ||  || G-Force  || Discovery EP The Discovery EP  ||
|-
| ECS 64 ||  || Mono  || Life in Mono (re-issue) ||
|-
| ECS 65 ||  || Babybird  || If You'll Be Mine  ||
|-
| ECS 67 ||  || Lhooq  || Lhooq (Promo sampler)  ||
|-
| ECS 68 ||  || Townshend, Fuzz Fuzz Townshend  || Get Yerself  ||
|-
| ECS 71 ||  || Moloko  || Sing It Back  ||
|-
| ECS 73 ||  || Babybird  || Back Together (Remix)  ||
|-
| ECS 75 ||  || Feeder  || Day In Day Out  ||
|-
| ECS 77 ||  || Feeder  || Insomnia  ||
|-
| ECS 78 ||  || Subcircus  || Do You Feel Loved  ||
|-
| ECS 79 ||  || Feeder  || Yesterday Went Too Soon  ||
|-
| ECS 80 ||  || Subcircus  || For Those Who Cannot Weep  ||
|-
| ECS 81 ||  || Fred & Roxy  || Something for the Weekend  ||
|-
| ECS 82 ||  || Moloko  || Sing It Back  ||
|-
| ECS 83 ||  || Utah Saints  || Love Song  ||
|-
| ECS 84 ||  || Pranksters  || Hot Hot Hot  ||
|-
| ECS 85 ||  || Feeder  || Paperfaces  ||
|-
| ECS 86 ||  || Subcircus  || 60 Second Love Affair  ||
|-
| ECS 87 ||  || Big Yoga Muffin  || Episode 1: 845183  ||
|-
| ECS 88 ||  || Moloko  || Time Is Now, The The Time Is Now  ||
|-
| ECS 91 ||  || Big Yoga Muffin  || Episode 2: Is That How You Get Off?  ||
|-
| ECS 92 ||  || Babybird  || F-Word, The The F-Word  ||
|-
| ECS 93 ||  || Dark Flower  || Love Will Bring Us Back Together  ||
|-
| ECS 94 ||  || Fred & Roxy  || Ten Times More (withdrawn)  ||
|-
| ECS 96 ||  || Utah Saints  || Funky Music  ||
|-
| ECS 97 ||  || Babybird  || Out of Sight  ||
|-
| ECS 99 ||  || Moloko  || Pure Pleasure Seeker  ||
|-
| ECS 100 ||  || Big Yoga Muffin  || Bordom Is a Luxury  ||
|-
| ECS 101 ||  || TBC...  || Something About You  ||
|-
| ECS 102 ||  || 666  || D.E.V.I.L.  ||
|-
| ECS 103 ||  || Utah Saints  || Power to the Beats  ||
|-
| ECS 104 ||  || Moloko  || Indigo  ||
|-
| ECS 105 ||  || Utah Saints  || Lost Vagueness  ||
|-
| ECS 106 ||  || Feeder  || Buck Rogers  ||
|-
| ECS 107 ||  || Feeder  || Seven Days in the Sun  ||
|-
| ECS 109 ||  || Mr. Phillips  || 7th Day (I Will Be There)  ||
|-
| ECS 110 ||  || Spek  || I'm a Hippie  ||
|-
| ECS 111 ||  || BYM  || Episode 4: Decorate My Rut  ||
|-
| ECS 112 ||  || Jean Jacques Smoothie  || 2 People  ||
|-
| ECS 113 ||  || Skymoo || Always & Forever  ||
|-
| ECS 116 ||  || Feeder  || Turn  ||
|-
| ECS 118 ||  || Spek  || Look Me Up EP  ||
|-
| ECS 119 ||  || DJ Innocence  || So Beautiful  ||
|-
| ECS 120 ||  || Psychedelic Waltons, The The Psychedelic Waltons  || Wonderland  ||
|-
| ECS 121 ||  || Feeder  || Just a Day  ||
|-
| ECS 122 ||  || Spek  || Smell the Coffee  ||
|-
| ECS 123 ||  || 666  || Supa-Dupa-Fly  ||
|-
| ECS 124 ||  || Reeload || Why  ||
|-
| ECS 126 ||  || Jean Jacques Smoothie  || Love & Evil  ||
|-
| ECS 127 ||  || Nio www.bobbynio.co.uk || Mash Up  ||
|-
| ECS 129 ||  || Desert Eagle Discs  || Bigger Better Deal  ||
|-
| ECS 130 ||  || Feeder  || Come Back Around  ||
|-
| ECS 131 ||  || Moloko  || Familiar Feeling  ||
|-
| ECS 132 ||  || Nio www.bobbynio.co.uk || Do You Think You're Special?  ||
|-
| ECS 133 ||  || Feeder  || Just the Way I'm Feeling  ||
|-
| ECS 134 ||  || I Am Kloot  || Untitled #1  ||
|-
| ECS 135 ||  || Feeder  || Forget About Tomorrow  ||
|-
| ECS 136 ||  || Moloko  || Forever More  ||
|-
| ECS 137 ||  || Mirwais  || Miss You  ||
|-
| ECS 138 ||  || I Am Kloot  || From Your Favourite Sky  ||
|-
| ECS 140 ||  || I Am Kloot  || Life in a Day  ||
|-
| ECS 142 ||  || Stands, The The Stands  || When This River Rolls Over You  ||
|-
| ECS 143 ||  || I Am Kloot  || 3 Feet Tall  ||
|-
| ECS 145 ||  || Feeder  || Find the Colour  ||
|-
| ECS 146 ||  || Stands, The The Stands  || I Need You  ||
|-
| ECS 147 ||  || Moloko  || Cannot Contain This  ||
|-
| ECS 148 ||  || Stands, The The Stands  || Here She Comes Again  ||
|-
| ECS 150 ||  || Engineers  || Home  ||
|-
| ECS 151 ||  || Stands, The The Stands  || Outside Your Door  ||
|-
| ECS 152 ||  || I Am Kloot  || Proof  ||
|-
| ECS 154 ||  || Engineers  || Come In Out of the Rain  ||
|-
| ECS 155 ||  || Lamontagne, Ray Ray LaMontagne  || Trouble  ||
|-
| ECS 156 ||  || Vacation, The The Vacation  || Destitute Prostitutes  ||
|-
| ECS 157 ||  || Feeder  || Tumble and Fall  ||
|-
| ECS 158 ||  || Murphy, Róisín Róisín Murphy  || Sequins 1  ||
|-
| ECS 159 ||  || Engineers  || Forgiveness  ||
|-
| ECS 160 ||  || I Am Kloot  || Over My Shoulder  ||
|-
| ECS 161 ||  || Murphy, Róisín Róisín Murphy  || Sequins 2  ||
|-
| ECS 162 ||  || Murphy, Róisín Róisín Murphy  || Sequins 3  ||
|-
| ECS 163 ||  || Feeder  || Feeling a Moment  ||
|-
| ECS 164 ||  || Morcheeba  || Wonders Never Cease  ||
|-
| ECS 165 ||  || Stands, The The Stands  || Do It Like You Like  ||
|-
| ECS 166 ||  || Engineers  || Home (withdrawn)  ||
|-
| ECS 167 ||  || I Am Kloot  || Gods and Monsters (Remix)  ||
|-
| ECS 169 ||  || Lamontagne, Ray Ray LaMontagne  || Forever My Friend  ||
|-
| ECS 170 ||  || Murphy, Róisín Róisín Murphy  || If We're in Love  ||
|-
| ECS 171 ||  || I Am Kloot  || I Believe (withdrawn)  ||
|-
| ECS 173 ||  || Feeder  || Pushing the Senses  ||
|-
| ECS 175 ||  || Black Rebel Motorcycle Club  || Ain't No Easy Way  ||
|-
| ECS 176 ||  || Morcheeba  || Lighten Up  ||
|-
| ECS 177 ||  || Stands, The The Stands  || When the Night Falls In (withdrawn)  ||
|-
| ECS 178 ||  || Black Rebel Motorcycle Club  || Weight of the World (withdrawn)  ||
|-
| ECS 179 ||  || Murphy, Róisín Róisín Murphy  || Sow into You  ||
|-
| ECS 180 ||  || Feeder  || Shatter / Tender  ||
|-
| ECS 181 ||  || Morcheeba  || Everybody Loves a Loser  ||
|-
| ECS 182 ||  || Lamontagne, Ray Ray LaMontagne  || Trouble (Remix)  ||
|-
| ECS 184 ||  || Feeder  || Lost & Found  ||
|-
| ECS 185 ||  || Bat for Lashes  || Wizard, The The Wizard  ||
|-
| ECS 186 ||  || Feeder  || Save Us  ||
|-
| ECS 188 ||  || Bat for Lashes  || Trophy  ||
|-
| ECS 189 ||  || Bat for Lashes  || Prescilla  ||
|-
| ECS 191 ||  || Lindsay, Steven Steven Lindsay  || Monkey Gone to Heaven  ||
|-
| ECS 194 ||  || Lindsay, Steven Steven Lindsay  || Kite  ||
|-
| ECS 195 ||  || Golden, Jacob Jacob Golden  || Out Come the Wolves / Zero Integrity  ||
|-
| ECS 196 ||  || Morcheeba  || Enjoy the Ride  ||
|-
| ECS 197 ||  || Tucek, Sarabeth Sarabeth Tucek  || Something for You  ||
|-
| ECS 198 ||  || Golden, Jacob Jacob Golden  || On a Saturday  ||
|-
| ECS 199 ||  || Feeder  || We Are the People  ||
|-
| ECS 200 ||  || Morcheeba  || Gained the World  ||
|-
| ECS 201 ||  || Tucek, Sarabeth Sarabeth Tucek  || Nobody Cares  ||
|-
| ECS 205 ||  || Feeder  || Tracing Lines / Silent Cry  ||
|-
| ECS 210 ||  || Nerina Pallot  || Real Late Starter  ||
|-
| ECS 213 ||  || Nerina Pallot  || I Don't Want To Go Out  ||
|}I'''  UK Indie Singles Chart

References

External links
Official website

Discographies of British record labels